The TK (TK-3) and TKS were Polish tankettes developed during the 1930s and used in the Second World War.

Design and development
In 1939, up-arming of the tankettes with Nkm wz.38 FK  machine guns began, but only 24 of these were completed before the outbreak of World War II.

On 6 November 1934 Estonia purchased 6 vehicles from Poland, with the contract deal worth over 180,000 krones. The deal also included one additional tracked-lorry, and a motorcycle was given free as a bonus. After the Soviet Union occupied Estonia, these vehicles were put into service with the Red Army.

Combat history

575 TK/TKS tankettes formed the bulk of the Polish armoured forces before the outbreak of war. They suffered heavy losses during the invasion of Poland, often being the only armoured fighting vehicles available. Their small size suited them for reconnaissance and infantry support, but with their light armament of a single machine gun they stood no chance in combat against German tanks, except against the Panzer I. 

The handful of tankettes armed with 20 mm guns were more effective against enemy tanks; in one instance on 18 September 1939 a 20 mm gunned TKS commanded by Podchorąży (Officer Candidate SFC) Roman Orlik destroyed two German Panzerkampfwagen 35(t) tanks and a Panzer IV B tank which was commanded by Victor IV Albrecht von Ratibor.

After the conquest of Poland, captured tankettes were used by the German army in various support roles, mostly for training, security duties or as artillery tractors. Many captured tankettes were also used by the Luftwaffe for airfield security and snowplowing. Some were later sold to the puppet state of Croatia. In spring 1941, the National Police received 18 TK-3 tankettes, some with the 20mm gun, while in summer 1941 the Army received 18 TKS, 4 of them being sent to the Ustashe Militia.

Variants

TK (TK-3) - from 1931, about 280 built (Ford A engine)
TKF - TK tankette with 46 hp (34 kW) Polski Fiat engine and new (TKS-type) suspension, about 18 built
TKS - improved model of 1933, about 260 built (new hull, suspension, Polski Fiat engine)
TKS with Nkm wz.38 FK - 20 mm gun - about 24 TKS fitted with 20 mm gun in 1939.
C2P - unarmoured light artillery tractor, about 200 built.

Experimental models:
TK-1, TK-2 - first prototypes
TKD - light self propelled gun with 47 mm gun, four made.
TKW - light reconnaissance tank with turret, one prototype made.
TK-3 with 20 mm gun - only one prototype with a modified hull was completed.
TKS-D - light tank destroyer with 37 mm Bofors anti-tank gun, two made

Users

 

 (possibly)

Surviving TK-series tankettes

There are only two fully operational TKS tankettes and one TK-3 surviving. All of them were reconstructed from wrecks in the first decade of 21st century, using non-original parts.
 1 x TKS - One of the TKS tankettes was donated to Poland by the Swedish Axvall Tank Museum and since 2008 it is on exhibition in the Museum of the Polish Army. The Swedish TKS survived the post-war period in Norway, where it was operated by a local farmer as a tractor.
 1 x TKS - Private collection.
 1 x TK-3 - Private collection.
The other survivors are not in working order.
 1 x TKS - On exhibition in the Kubinka Tank Museum in Russia.
 1 x TKF - On exhibition in the Military Museum in Belgrade.
 1 x TKS - Returned from the Norwegian Armed Forces museum to the Armoured Weapon Museum in Poznan, Poland
 1 x C2P artillery tractor - Was found in Belgium and bought by the National Military History Center of Auburn, Indiana, where it is currently on exhibition.

Gallery

Comparable vehicles
 Czechoslovakia Tančík vz. 33 and AH-IV
 France Renault UE2
 Italy: L3/33 • L3/35
 Japan: Type 94
 Romania: R-1
 Soviet Union: T-27 • T-37A • T-38
 Sweden: Strv m/37 
 United Kingdom: Carden Loyd tankette

References

 Adam Jońca, Rajmund Szubański, Jan Tarczyński Wrzesień 1939 Pojazdy Wojska Polskiego wyd. WKiŁ Warszawa 1990 
 Magnuski Janusz "Czołg rozpoznawczy TK (TKS)" seria TBiU-Typy broni i uzbrojenia (tom: 36), MON 1975

Bibliography
Janusz Magnuski, "Karaluchy przeciw panzerom"; Pelta; Warsaw 1995
Leszek Komuda, "Przeciwpancerne tankietki" in: "Militaria" Year 1 Nr. 3 and Nr. 4.
Adam Jońca, Rajmund Szubański, Jan Tarczyński, "Wrzesień 1939 - Pojazdy Wojska Polskiego - Barwa i broń"; WKL; Warsaw 1990.
Jan Tarczyński, K. Barbarski, A. Jońca, "Pojazdy w Wojsku Polskim - Polish Army Vehicles - 1918-1939"; Ajaks; Pruszków 1995.
"Czołg rozpoznawczy TK-S", Militaria i Fakty nr. 31 (6/2005)
Janusz Magnuski, "Czołg rozpoznawczy TKS (TK)"; TBiU nr. 36; Wydawnictwo MON; Warsaw 1975
Zbigniew Lalak, "Czołg rozpoznawczy TK3 / Reconnaissance tank TK3" in Z. Lalak, T. Basarabowicz, R. Sawicki, M. Skotnicki, P. Żurkowski "Pojazdy II wojny swiatowej (tom 2) / Military Vehicles of WW2, part 2", Warsaw 2004, 
Eesti soomusmasinad : soomusautod ja tankid 1918-1940 / Tiit Noormets, Mati Õun Tallinn : Tammiskilp, 1999 Page 52

External links

 Articles on TK/TKS development, variants and construction in English  in Polish Armour 1918-1939  website
 TK & TKS tankettes wwiivehicles.com
 TK Tankette Series Small / Light Reconnaissance Tank  achtungpanzer.com
 TKS before and after restoration 

World War II armoured fighting vehicles of Poland
World War II tankettes
Tankettes of the interwar period
Military vehicles introduced in the 1930s
Tankettes